Schefflera mannii is a species of plant in the family Araliaceae. It is found in Cameroon, Equatorial Guinea, Nigeria, and São Tomé and Príncipe. Its natural habitat is subtropical or tropical moist montane forests. It is threatened by habitat loss.

References

mannii
Vulnerable plants
Taxonomy articles created by Polbot